Aurora de esperanza (Dawn of Hope) is a 1937 black-and-white film directed by Antonio Sau and produced by SIE Films.

Plot 

A drama about the economic situation of the working-class and the start of the social revolution, Aurora de Esperanza opens with Juan, who has just returned from a vacation with his family to find himself unemployed. Searching futilely for work, Juan grows increasingly frustrated. His wife, Marta, agrees to a humiliating job to feed their children, and when Juan finds out he sends them all to the village while he wanders the city. Outraged by the working class's conformism, Juan makes a speech to the workers, while organizing a "hunger march" with the unemployed. They march to the city to protest to the authorities, and the social revolution passes through the village where his family is. Juan takes up arms with them as the revolution marches to the front lines, hoping for a better dawn.

Cast 

 Félix de Pomés as Juan
 Enriqueta Soler as Marta
 Pilar Torres as La tanguista
 Ana María Campoy as Pilarín
 Román González "Chispita" as Antoñito

See also 
 List of films produced in the Spanish Revolution
 List of Spanish films of the 1930s

References

External links
 

1937 films
1937 drama films
1930s Spanish-language films
Spanish black-and-white films
SIE Films films
Films about revolutions
Spanish drama films